Irwin is an unincorporated community and census-designated place in northern Barton County, Missouri, United States. As of the 2020 census it had a population of 47.

History
Irwin was platted in 1884. The community has the name of the Irwin family of settlers. A post office called Irwin was established in 1884, and remained in operation until 1981.

Geography

Demographics

References

Census-designated places in Missouri
Unincorporated communities in Barton County, Missouri
Unincorporated communities in Missouri